The 2003 Men's Hockey Champions Challenge took place in Johannesburg, South Africa from 19–27 July 2003.

Spain earned a spot at the 2004 Champions Trophy in Lahore, Pakistan after defeated Korea 7–3 in the final.


Squads

Head Coach: Mike Hamilton

Head Coach: Paul Lissek

Head Coach: Charlie Oscroft

Head Coach: Paul Revington

Head Coach: Kim Young-Kyu

Head Coach: Maurits Hendriks

Umpires
Below are the 9 umpires appointed by the International Hockey Federation:

Results
All times are South African Standard Time (UTC+02:00)

Pool

Classification

Fifth and sixth place

Third and fourth place

Final

Awards

Statistics

Final ranking

External links
Official FIH website
Official website

C
C
2003
Men's Hockey Champions Challenge I